Hansi Lang (born 13 January 1955 in Vienna; died 24 August 2008 in Vienna) was an Austrian singer and actor.

Discography

Alben
Keine Angst (1982)
Der Taucher (1982)
Pyramidenmann (1984)
Ich oder Du (1984)
Hansi Lang (1989)
Losgeher (1993)
The Original Very Best Of (1993)
Spiele Leben – Live (1998)

The Slow Club
Welcome to the Slow Club, EP (2004)
This Is the Slow Club (2005)
House of Sleep (2008)

Awards
2006: Amadeus Austrian Music Award for This Is The Slow Club in the category "Jazz/Blues/Folk-Album des Jahres national" mit The Slow Club
2006: Goldenes Verdienstzeichen der Stadt Wien
2009: Amadeus Austrian Music Award in the category "Lifetime Achievement Award"

Literature
Fabian Burstein: Kind ohne Zeit – Das intensive Leben des Hansi Lang, Biografie, Residenz Verlag 2008

References

1955 births
2008 deaths
20th-century Austrian male actors
20th-century Austrian male singers
English-language singers from Austria